JunoCam (or JCM) is the visible-light camera/telescope onboard NASA's Juno spacecraft currently orbiting Jupiter. The camera is operated by the JunoCam Digital Electronics Assembly (JDEA). Both the camera and JDEA were built by Malin Space Science Systems. JunoCam takes a swath of imaging as the spacecraft rotates; the camera is fixed to the spacecraft, so as it rotates, it gets one sweep of observation. It has a field of view of 58 degrees with four filters (3 for visible light).

Planned goals and outcome

Originally, due to telecommunications constraints, Juno was expected to only be able to return about 40 megabytes of camera data during each 11-day orbital period (the orbital period was later modified). The downlink average data rate of around 325 bits per second will limit the number of images that are captured and transmitted during each orbit to somewhere between 10 and 100 depending on the compression level used. This is comparable to the previous Galileo mission that orbited Jupiter, which captured thousands of images despite its slow data rate of 1000 bits per second (at maximum compression levels) due to antenna problems that prevented operation with its planned 135,000 bit-per-second communications link.

The primary observation target is Jupiter itself, although limited images of some of Jupiter's moons have been taken and more are intended. JunoCam successfully returned detailed images of Ganymede after Juno's flyby on June 7, 2021, with further opportunities including planned flybys of Europa on September 29, 2022, and two of Io scheduled for December 30, 2023 and February 3, 2024. These flybys will also reduce Juno's orbital period to 33 days.

The JunoCam project is led by Candice Hansen-Koharcheck. JunoCam is not one of the probe's core scientific instruments; it was put on board primarily for public science and outreach, to increase public engagement, with all images available on NASA's website. It is capable of being used for science, and does have some coordinated activities in regards to this, as well as to engage amateur and as well as professional infrared astronomers.

Design 

The JunoCam physical and electronic interfaces are largely based on the MARDI instrument for the Mars Science Laboratory. However, the housing and some aspects of the camera's inner mechanism have been modified to provide stable operation in Jupiter's intense radiation environment and magnetic fields.

However, within one hour of closest approach to Jupiter it can take up to  pixel, thus exceeding the resolution of Cassini up to that time on Saturn.

In addition to visible light filters, it also has a near infrared filter to help detect clouds; a methane filter in addition the visible color filters. The camera is a "push-broom" type imager, generating an image as the spacecraft turns moving the sensor in sweeping motion over the observation area.

One of the constraints for JunoCam hardware was mass, which limited the size of the optics.

Specifications and mission

The camera and the mission were not designed to study the moons of Jupiter. JunoCam has a field of view that is too wide to resolve any detail in the Jovian moons except during close flybys. Jupiter itself may only appear to be 75 pixels across from JunoCam when Juno reaches the furthest point of its orbit around the planet. At its closest approaches, JunoCam could achieve 15 km/pixel resolution from 4300 km, while Hubble has taken images of up to 119 km/pixel from 600 million km.

The camera uses a Kodak image sensor, the KODAK KAI-2020, capable of color imaging at 1600 x 1200 pixels: less than 2 megapixels. It has a field of view of 58 degrees with four filters (red, green, blue, and a methane band) to provide color imaging. The low resolution, rigid mounting and lossy compression, applied before transmission makes it effectively the Juno "dashcam".

Junos orbit is highly elongated and takes it close to the poles (within ), but then far beyond Callisto's orbit, the most distant Galilean moon. This orbital design helps the spacecraft (and its complement of scientific instruments) avoid Jupiter's radiation belts, which have a record of damaging spacecraft electronics and solar panels. The Juno Radiation Vault with its titanium walls also aids in protecting and shielding Juno's electronics. Despite the intense magnetosphere of Jupiter, JunoCam was expected to be operational for at least the first eight orbits (September 2017), but as of June 2021 (34 orbits) remains active and has also been re-purposed from an outreach-only camera to a scientific instrument to study the dynamics of Jupiter's clouds, polar storms, and moons.

Images
Earth

Jupiter system

Additional camera proposal 
In 2005 the Italian Space Agency (ASI) proposed an additional visible light instrument "ItaCam", but instead they built a near-infrared camera/spectrometer, the Jovian Infrared Auroral Mapper (JIRAM) and a Ka-band transponder. ASI previously contributed a near-infrared instrument to the Cassini–Huygens Saturn probe. The Ka-band instrument, KaTS, is a component of the Gravity Science experiment.

See also
Galileo (spacecraft), NASA space probe to Jupiter 1989–2003.
Citizen science

Other cameras manufactured by Malin Space Science Systems:
Mars Color Imager for the Mars Reconnaissance Orbiter (MRO) spacecraft
Context (CTX) Camera also for the MRO spacecraft
Mars Orbiter Camera

Other Juno instruments:
Jovian Auroral Distributions Experiment (JADE)
Jovian Infrared Auroral Mapper (JIRAM)
JEDI
Magnetometer (Juno) (MAG)

References

External links

MSSS JunoCam for Juno Jupiter Orbiter 
Big Dipper (Ursa Major) by JunoCam 
Earth flyby pics (B&W and color)
Earth flyby pics (raw)
Earth flyby pic (B&W)
JunoCam image release gallery
Little Red Spot by JunoCam (Jan 26, 2017 release from Dec flyby)
Series of images of the GRS by JunoCam

Space imagers
Space telescopes
Juno (spacecraft)